Jacob Bagersted (born March 25, 1987) is a Danish handballer, currently playing for German side SC Magdeburg.

Despite his young age, he has already played for the Danish national handball team.

External links
 Aalborg Håndbold home page 

1987 births
Living people
Danish male handball players
Handball players from Copenhagen